William "Tickle" Miller Whyte (16 August 1903 – November 1964) was an Australian athlete who competed in the 1928 Summer Olympics.

In 1928 he finished ninth the 1500 metres event. In the 800 metre competition he was eliminated in the first round. At the 1930 Empire Games he won the silver medal in the 1 mile contest. He also participated in the 880 yards event.

He married Alma in November 1927, and they had one daughter, Fay Delores, born in 1928.

External links
sports-reference.com

1903 births
1964 deaths
Australian male middle-distance runners
Olympic athletes of Australia
Athletes (track and field) at the 1928 Summer Olympics
Athletes (track and field) at the 1930 British Empire Games
Commonwealth Games silver medallists for Australia
Commonwealth Games medallists in athletics
Medallists at the 1934 British Empire Games